MUDr. Jaroslava Moserová, DrSc. (born 17 January 1930, Prague, died 24 March 2006, Prague) was a Czech senator, ambassador, presidential candidate, doctor, and translator.

Biography
Moserová was born into a Czech-Jewish family in Prague. She was originally a physician with a specialization in skin burns. She was the first doctor to attempt treatment for Jan Palach after his self-immolation on 16 January 1969. She wrote a number of stories, screenplays, dramas, and translated over forty books by Dick Francis into Czech. She entered politics in 1990 as chairwomen of the committee of science, education and culture. In 1991–1993, she was the ambassador of Czechoslovakia in Australia and New Zealand. From 1996–1999 she was vice-President of the Senate of the Czech Republic.

In 1999, she became president of the General Session of UNESCO. At the 2003 presidential election she unsuccessfully ran for president of the Czech Republic. French President Jacques Chirac honored her as an Officer of the Légion d'honneur. She died of cancer on 24 March 2006, in Prague at the age of 76.

References

External links

Members of the Senate of the Czech Republic
1930 births
2006 deaths
Deaths from cancer in the Czech Republic
Czech plastic surgeons
Czech women writers
English–Czech translators
Czech translators
Officiers of the Légion d'honneur
Politicians from Prague
20th-century translators
20th-century women writers
Candidates in the 2003 Czech presidential election
KDU-ČSL presidential candidates
Civic Democratic Alliance Senators
Female candidates for President of the Czech Republic
Civic Democratic Alliance presidential candidates
Ambassadors of the Czech Republic to Australia
20th-century Czech women politicians
21st-century Czech women politicians
20th-century surgeons